SS M. H. De Young was an American Liberty ship built in 1943 for service in World War II. She was later acquired by the United States Navy and renamed USS Antelope (IX-109).  Her namesake was M. H. de Young, an American journalist and businessman from 1865 to 1925.

Description 

The engine was built by the Worthington Pump & Machinery Corporation, Harrison, New Jersey.

Construction and career 
M. H. De Young was laid down on 15 June 1943  Richmond, California, by the Permanente Metals Corp., under a Maritime Commission contract (M.C.E. Hull 1587). She was launched on 6 July 1943 and sponsored by Mrs. George T. Cameron. the ship was delivered to the Maritime Commission at 3:15 p.m. on 19 July 1943.

Operated under a general agency agreement by R. A. Nicol & Company, M. H. DeYoung was torpedoed by the Japanese submarine I-19 (the celebrated Cmdr. Brought into Espíritu Santo in the New Hebrides, the Liberty ship was partially repaired on board USS Artisan (ABSD-1) and taken over by the Navy under a bareboat charter at 12:01 a.m. on 4 October 1943. She was renamed Antelope (IX-109) and placed in service the day she was taken over.

Antelope had her engines removed and spent the entire war as a non-self-propelled dry cargo storage vessel assigned to Service Squadron 8. Scanty records make it impossible to compile a list of locations at which Antelope served, but Espíritu Santo appears to have been her first duty station and Subic Bay in the Philippines was her last known location while still a naval vessel. It is also possible that she saw some duty at Leyte when support forces established a base there after the Battle of Leyte. In any event, she was inspected at Subic Bay and found to be beyond economical repair and surplus to the needs of the Navy.

Antelope was placed out of service and laid up at Subic Bay at 11:00 a.m. on 3 May 1946 and was simultaneously delivered to the Maritime Commission's War Shipping Administration. Her name was stricken from the Navy Register on 21 May 1946, and, along with 14 other vessels, she was sold for scrapping to the Asia Development Corp., Shanghai, China, on 3 March 1948. The ship was broken up in 1950.

Awards 
 Asiatic-Pacific Campaign Medal
 World War II Victory Medal

References 

 

Liberty ships
Ships built in Richmond, California
1943 ships
Maritime incidents in 1943